Jerzy Walerian Braun (13 April 1911 – 8 March 1968) was a Polish rower who competed in the 1932 Summer Olympics and in the 1936 Summer Olympics.

Braun was born in Bromberg in Western Prussia in 1911; the town was renamed Bydgoszcz when it became part of Poland.

He won the silver medal as member of the Polish boat in the coxed pairs competition as well as the bronze medal as member of the Polish boat in the coxed fours competition. Four years later he was part of the Polish boat which was eliminated in the repechage of the coxed pair event.

During World War II he fought in the Polish Armed Forces in the West as an officer in the Second Polish Army Corps. After the war Braun moved to England where he died aged 56 on 8 March 1968 at Crawley, he is buried at Snell Hatch Cemetery in West Green.

References

External links
 profile 

1911 births
1968 deaths
Olympic rowers of Poland
Olympic medalists in rowing
Olympic silver medalists for Poland
Olympic bronze medalists for Poland
Sportspeople from Bydgoszcz
Polish Army officers
Polish military personnel of World War II
Polish male rowers
Rowers at the 1932 Summer Olympics
Rowers at the 1936 Summer Olympics
Medalists at the 1932 Summer Olympics
Polish emigrants to the United Kingdom
European Rowing Championships medalists
20th-century Polish people